The 1954 Memorial Cup final was the 36th junior ice hockey championship of the Canadian Amateur Hockey Association. The George Richardson Memorial Trophy champions St. Catharines Teepees of the Ontario Hockey Association in Eastern Canada competed against the Abbott Cup champions Edmonton Oil Kings of the Western Canada Junior Hockey League in Western Canada. In a best-of-seven series, held at Maple Leaf Gardens in Toronto, Ontario, St. Catharines won their 1st Memorial Cup, defeating Edmonton 4 games to 0 with 1 tie.

Scores
Game 1: St. Catharines 8-2 Edmonton
Game 2: St. Catharines 5-3 Edmonton
Game 3: St. Catharines 4-1 Edmonton
Game 4: Edmonton 3-3 St. Catharines
Game 5: St. Catharines 6-2 Edmonton

Winning roster
Jack Armstrong, Hugh Barlow, Hank Ciesla, Barry Cullen, Brian Cullen, Nelson Bulloch, Ian Cushanen, Marv Edwards, Jack Higgins, Cecil Hoekstra, Pete Koval, Bob Maxwell, Don McLean, Wimpy Roberts, Reg Truax, Elmer Vasko, Chester Warchol.  Coach: Rudy Pilous

References

External links
 Memorial Cup 
 Canadian Hockey League

1953–54 in Canadian ice hockey
Memorial Cup tournaments
Ice hockey competitions in Toronto
1950s in Toronto